Andrei Vacarciuc (born July 17, 1952) is a politician from Moldova. He has been a member of the Parliament of Moldova since 2010.

External links 
 Site-ul Parlamentului Republicii Moldova

References

1952 births
Living people
Liberal Democratic Party of Moldova MPs
Moldovan MPs 2010–2014